Bergenhus is a borough of the city of Bergen in Vestland county, Norway. This borough encompasses the city centre and is the most urbanized area of the whole city. The  borough has a population (2014) of 40,606.

Location

Named after the historic Bergenhus Fortress, Bergenhus makes up the city centre and the neighborhoods immediately surrounding it, including Sandviken and Kalfaret, as well as the mountains to the north and east of the city centre. It stretches from Haukeland University Hospital in the south to Lønborg in the north, and includes the entire mountainside  and the peninsula bounded by the inlets of Store Lungegårdsvannet, Puddefjorden and Byfjorden that form the city's center.

Bergenhus is surrounded by the neighborhoods Åsane in the north, Arna in the east, Årstad to the south, Laksevåg to the west and by Askøy to the northwest.

The borough of Bergenhus includes the neighborhoods of Bryggen, Ladegården, Kalfaret, Møhlenpris, Nordnes, Sandviken, Solheimsviken, Sydnes, and Verftet. It is the site of some of the most historic buildings in Bergen including Bergenhus Fortress with Haakon's Hall and Rosenkrantz Tower. It is also the location of the University of Bergen, Bergen Cathedral, St. Mary's Church, and Holy Cross Church.

Higher education
Bergen School of Architecture
Grieg Academy
University of Bergen
Norwegian School of Management
Norwegian School of Economics

Neighborhoods
The list of neighborhoods include: Bontelabo, Bryggen, Eidemarken, Engen, Fjellet, Kalfaret, Ladegården, Marken, Møhlenpris, Nordnes,
Nygård, Nøstet, Sandviken, Sentrum, Skansen, Skolten, Skuteviken, Strandsiden, Stølen, Sydnes, Verftet, Vågsbunnen, and Ytre Sandviken.

Sentrum
Sentrum is a neighborhood (that lies within the boundaries of a former borough with the same name) that borders the neighborhoods Vågsbunnen, Strandsiden, Nøstet, Engen, Sydnes, Nygård and Marken.

The neighborhood lies around the main town square of Torgallmenningen and Lille Lungegårdsvann.

The boundaries of the neighborhood are the road Østre Muralmenning to the north; Strandgaten, Vågsalmenning, and Allehelgensgate to the east; Fredrik Motzfeldt's Street, Lille Lungerårdsvannet to Fossvinkels gate to St Paul Church, to Rosenbergsgaten, then to Vestre Torvgate, then to Vaskerelven, then down to Vaskerelvsmauet to Olav Vs plass, to Øvre Ole Bulls plass, to Veiten, to Markeveien, to Christian Michelsens gate, to Kalmargaten and Gartnergaten to Kjellersmauet, to Østre Muralmenning.

The neighborhood encompasses three 'grunnkrets': Strandkaien, Torgalmenningen, and Vaskerelven. These had 818 inhabitants in 2014.

Monuments
Monuments include 'Den blå stein' (the blue stone) at Klosterhaugen, portraying Amalie Skram.

Local attractions
{{Historical populations
|footnote = Source: Statistics Norway.
|shading = off
|1980|35532  	
|1990|29850  	  	
|2001|32097  	  	
|2011|38544		  	
}}
Bergenhus Fortress 
Haakon's Hall 
Rosenkrantz Tower
Koengen
Sverresborg Fortress (Bergenhus festning) 
St Mary's Church (Mariakirken)
Bergen Cathedral (Bergen domkirke)
St John's Church (Johanneskirken)
Holy Cross Church (Korskirken)
New Church (Nykirken)
Sandvik Church (Sandvikskirken'')
Biskopshavn Church

References

Footnotes

Bibliography

Boroughs of Bergen